On 7 August 2003, a bomb exploded outside the Jordanian embassy in Baghdad, Iraq, killing 17 people and injuring dozens more. The bomb, concealed in a minibus, exploded outside the walls of the embassy compound at around 11:00am local time. The force of the explosion sent a car onto a nearby rooftop and killed several people nearby including women and children. Six police officers guarding the embassy were among the dead. Immediately after the blast, the embassy compound was swarmed by a mob of Iraqis who ransacked the building, chanting anti-Jordanian slogans and burning portraits of King Abdullah II. According to Lieutenant-General Ricardo Sanchez, the commander of US forces in Iraq, the attack was the worst in Iraq since the capture of Baghdad that previous March.

Perpetrators
No group claimed the attack. A team of agents from the Federal Bureau of Investigation was dispatched to Iraq shortly after to investigate the bombing. Abu Musab al-Zarqawi, a Jordanian insurgent leader, was the prime suspect in the investigation. The attack came a week after Jordan granted asylum to the daughters of Saddam Hussein, a move which angered numerous Iraqis.

References

External links
Baghdad blast kills 10 at Jordanian Embassy (CNN)

Bombing of Jordanian embassy, 2003
Bombing of Jordanian embassy in Baghdad
Bombing of Jordanian embassy in Baghdad
Bombing of Jordanian embassy in Baghdad
Bombing of Jordanian embassy in Baghdad
Bombing of Jordanian embassy in Baghdad
Bombing of Jordanian embassy
Bombing of Jordanian embassy in Baghdad
Bombing of Jordanian embassy in Baghdad, 2003
Attacks on buildings and structures in 2003
Attacks on buildings and structures in Baghdad
Attacks on diplomatic missions in Iraq
Baghdad
Bombing of Jordanian embassy in Baghdad
Bombing of Jordanian embassy in Baghdad
Bus bombings in Asia
Car and truck bombings in Iraq
Bombing of Jordanian embassy in Baghdad
Improvised explosive device bombings in Baghdad
Embassy bombing in Baghdad
Bombing of Jordanian embassy in Baghdad
Mass murder in Baghdad
Road incidents in Iraq
Bombing of Jordanian embassy in Baghdad
Building bombings in Iraq
2003 disasters in Iraq